Bangladesh first competed at the Asian Games in 1978 and won its first medal in 1986.

Medal tables

Medals by Asian Games

List of medalists

Medals by sport

References